Harnick is a surname. Notable people with the surname include:

Charles Harnick (born 1950), Canadian politician
Sheldon Harnick (born 1924), American songwriter

See also
Harnack